Saligrama Ramegowda Mahesh is an Indian politician  who served as Minister of Tourism and Sericulture from 6 June 2018 to 8 July 2019 and he is currently Member of Karnataka Legislative Assembly from Krishnarajanagara Assembly constituency since 2008.

References 

People from Mysore
Living people
Karnataka MLAs 2018–2023
1966 births
Karnataka MLAs 2008–2013
Karnataka MLAs 2013–2018